Arnold Bouka Moutou (born 28 November 1988) is a professional footballer who plays as a left-back for Canadian club Valour FC. Born in France, he represented Congo at international level.

Club career

Dijon
In July 2016, Bouka Moutou was transferred to newly promoted Ligue 1 side Dijon for a fee of €400,000. He made his first-team debut on 17 September 2016 in a 0–0 draw against Metz. In the 2016–17 season, he made a total of ten first-team appearances, two appearances in the French Cup and three reserve team appearances in CFA 2.

The following season, Bouka Moutou made six first-team league appearances and one appearance in the Coupe de la Ligue. With the reserve side, he made five appearances. The 2018–19 season saw a further reduction in first-team playing time for Bouka Moutou, as he made only three league appearances and two in the French Cup, while making another five appearances with the reserves. He departed the club at the end of that season after his contract ran out.

Valour FC
On 28 February 2020, Bouka Moutou signed with Canadian Premier League side Valour FC. He made his debut for Valour on August 16 against Cavalry FC.

International career
He represented the Congo national team at the 2015 Africa Cup of Nations, where his team advanced to the quarterfinals. He scored his only international goal against Egypt on 8 October 2017 (this was a FIFA World Cup qualifying match that resulted in Egypt winning 2–1 and going to the 2018 finals).

Career statistics

Club

International

International goals

Scores and results list Congo's goal tally first.

References

External links
 
 
 

1988 births
Living people
Association football defenders
French footballers
Republic of the Congo footballers
Sportspeople from Reims
French sportspeople of Republic of the Congo descent
French expatriate footballers
Republic of the Congo expatriate footballers
Expatriate soccer players in Canada
French expatriate sportspeople in Canada
Republic of the Congo expatriate sportspeople in Canada
RC Épernay Champagne players
Amiens SC players
AC Amiens players
Calais RUFC players
Angers SCO players
Dijon FCO players
Valour FC players
Championnat National 2 players
Championnat National 3 players
Ligue 2 players
Ligue 1 players
Canadian Premier League players
Republic of the Congo international footballers
2015 Africa Cup of Nations players
Footballers from Grand Est
Black French sportspeople